Dave Tucker is a former professional rugby league footballer who played in the 1960s. He played at club level for the Featherstone Rovers (Heritage № 435).

Club career
Dave Tucker made his debut for the Featherstone Rovers on Saturday 15 February 1964.

References

External links
Search for "Tucker" at rugbyleagueproject.org

Featherstone Rovers players
Place of birth missing
English rugby league players
Year of birth missing